Cadet College Razmak is a military high school, located in the valley of Razmak, in North Waziristan, Federally Administered Tribal Areas (FATA), Pakistan.

History

The college was founded by the late prime minister of Pakistan, Zulfiqar Ali Bhutto, in the late 1970s during his visit to Miranshah, North Waziristan agency. Initially it was set in Razmak lower camp. The institution feeds the Pakistan Military Academy at Kakul.

The college became operational in 1978 on the land of Nawab Gulmaizar Khan, with a single boarding hostel, Ghazali House. Mr. Asghar Ali Choudhry was appointed its first principal. Later that year, another boarding hostel, Bilal House, was established.

In 1979, owing to the increasing number of cadets, a third boarding hostel, Jinnah House, was established. Former Major Geoffrey Langlands, an Aitchison College teacher, was appointed the principal.

The fourth boarding hostel, Babar House, was established in 1980. The fifth boarding hostel, Abdali house, was established in 1981 and another, Khushal house, in 1982. In 1997, due to increasing number of students, the 7th hostel, Iqbal House, was established. However, it was later dispensed with.
 
In 1988, Jan Gul Khattak was appointed as a principal. 

In 1991, Michael C. Cawthrone took charge as principal.

1997 marked a turn-around for Cadet College Razmak. Brig (R) Bashir Hussain Khattak took over as the principal and  revolutionized the college. During his tenure, the college saw major infrastructure changes. 
 
In 2003, Mr. Khan Muhammad Khalil was appointed principal. In 2008, Prof. Quresh Khan was selected as an acting principal, and then Mr. Javed Iqbal Paracha became principal.
 
In June 2009, hundreds of students and some teachers of the college were kidnapped by Taliban militants on their way to Bannu from Razmak. All were released within three days, however due to the uncertain situation the college's academic setup was shifted to Islamia College Peshawar.
 
In May 2011, Roughly two years after being displaced from their home campus, the Razmians shifted back to Razmak.

In April 2012, The College was again shifted to Aman Ghar due to prevailing law & order situation in North Waziristan.

In March 2013, The complete college was shifted to Nowshera cantt from Aman Ghar due to bad infrastructure. The new accommodation fulfills all the requirements of the college.

Academics
The students are prepared for the Secondary School Certificate and Intermediate Examination conducted by the Federal Board of Intermediate and Secondary Education, Islamabad. The following subjects are taught:
 Secondary School Certificate Examination: English, Urdu, Islamiat, Pakistan studies, mathematics, physics, chemistry and computer science.
 Intermediate Examination (Pre-Engineering Group): English, Urdu, Islamic Studies, Pakistan studies, mathematics, physics and chemistry.
 Intermediate Examination (Pre-Medical Group): English, Urdu, Islamic Studies, Pakistan studies, biology, physics and chemistry.
 Intermediate Examination (Computer Science): English, Urdu, Islamic Studies, Pakistan studies, mathematics, physics and computer science.

Student life
Cadets take part in sports such as field hockey, football, Cricket, basketball, swimming, volleyball, squash and tennis. Fitness activities include judo, karate, gymnastics, jogging and running. Physical training is conducted in the morning and sports in the evening. Students are taught drill.

Religious education
Islamiat is a compulsory subject. Motivational talks and prayers in the college mosque supplement religious education in the classrooms.

Examinations
The college holds internal examinations to assess the ability of the students and prepare them for the Board Examinations. Progress tests, Send Ups and Pre-Board Examinations are a feature of the college schedule.

The parents and guardians are kept informed of their son's or ward's overall performance and attitude. Students showing consistently poor performance are withdrawn from the college.

CCR has always produced outstanding results in Board Examinations. The boys take full advantage of the conducive academic atmosphere at the college and are among the top position holders in the BISE BANNU examinations.

Houses 
The college is divided into six houses

Infrastructure 

The buildings comprise a mosque, a double-stored academic block, auditorium, six hostels called "houses", one combined cadets' mess, an administration block, and a science block. Sports facilities includes four squash courts and football, hockey, cricket, basketball, volleyball grounds and six tennis courts.  The college has residential accommodation for the teaching and administrative staff.

Principals
 Choudhry Asghar Ali
 Major G. D. Langland
 Sq. Ldr. Agha Khalil Ahmed
 Colonel Jan Gul Khattak
 Michal C. Cawthorne
 Brigadier Bashir Hussain (Retired)
 Prof. Khan Muhammad Khalil
 Prof. Quresh Khan 
 Prof.Javed Iqbal Paracha
 Maj (R) Manzoor Hussain Qureshi
 Prof. Abdus Salam 
 Colonel Tahir Qayyum (Deputed)
 Prof.Gul Zamin
 Brigadier Shafqat Abbas (Deputed)

Hospital
The college has a 50-bed hospital. A full-time medical officer assisted by three dispensers look after the health of cadets. The college hospital has its own ambulance. Cadets are referred to C.M.H. Bannu for medical treatment as well. In emergency cadets are treated in Shawal Rifles CMH Hospital, Razmak.

Mess and dining hall
The messing officer supervises the working of the messes. The caterer looks after the procurement and supply of dry and fresh provisions. Every effort is made to provide a balanced and nutritious diet with several fruits. Meals include breakfast, milk during breakfast, refreshment during break, lunch, evening tea and dinner.

Selection/induction of cadets
Thousands of aspiring students apply for admission to Cadet College Razmak each year. A selection procedure is adopted for enrolling a batch of 126 students or cadets in Class 8th.

Eligibility criteria
 Gender – male
 Religion – any
 Education – the candidate should be studying in Class 7th in a registered school. Candidates who have just passed Class 7th and are studying in Class 8th are also eligible.
 Age – 12 to 14 years

Admission tests
 Written tests are conducted simultaneously at centers in Peshawar, Bannu, Dera Ismail Khan, Quetta, and Gilgit. The tests consist of questions in the subjects of English, mathematics and Islamiat/Urdu. The results of the written tests are advertised in newspapers (especially the Daily Mashriq, Peshawar) and the successful candidates are notified by post.
 Interviews – Candidates short-listed on the basis of written tests are interviewed by boards consisting of the college's teachers at centers in Peshawar and other cities. During the interview, the candidates also take IQ and psychological tests.
 Medical fitness tests – Side by side with the interview, the short-listed candidates are also checked by a medical doctor for medical and physical fitness. A candidate failing in the medical fitness test, although otherwise cleared by the interview board, is rejected.

Seats distribution
Admission to the college is, for the most part, on a quota basis. The seats distribution is as below:
 FATA (Agencies and FRs) – almost 70% of seats are reserved for candidates belonging to the agencies and FRs of FATA. Within FATA, five to six seats are reserved for each agency and two seats for each FR, so the total number of FATA seats reaches 5
 Frontier Corps – ten seats are reserved for wards of FC (Frontier Corps) personnel
 Khyber PukhtoonKhwa – ten seats are reserved for candidates from the settled districts of the Khyber PukhtoonKhwa province. Within KPK, the seats are distributed on open-merit
 Balochistan – one seat is reserved for candidates from the districts of the Balochistan province,
 Staff wards – wards of college staff are eligible for admission cin the college

Golden Night
The last night of each term in the college is called Golden Night. This night has an always been of great importance in a cadet's life because the next morning, cadets leave for their homes after a three to five-month term in the college. The cadets mostly remain awake through the night and some indulge in activities like throwing water over the sleeping fellows, and other mischief.

Free Night
The weekend night in the college is called Free Night. There are no preps and practically no lights out (sleep) timings to be observed. Cadets get their weekly pocket money in the evening and go to the cafeteria/canteen for refreshments. Occasionally Free Night also becomes Movie Night when a movie (mostly English) is screened in the auditorium.

Leavers Day
The cadets of each outgoing 12th Class are called Leavers and their final day, after having spent six years in the college, is called Leavers Day. The day is marked by functions and activities in which the cadets of the outgoing 12th class are chief guests.

In the evening a farewell dinner is hosted in honour of the Leavers which is followed by a cultural function in which all the cadets, teachers and other staff participate. The cadets traditional dance "Attannr" to the bang of a dhol and nobody, not even the principal, can refuse taking part in the "Attannr".

The next day, early in the morning, the Leavers are bade farewell by the teachers and junior cadets.

References

Razmak
Educational institutions established in 1978
Military in the Federally Administered Tribal Areas
Schools in Khyber Pakhtunkhwa
1978 establishments in Pakistan
Boarding schools in Pakistan